Joliette station is a Montreal Metro station in the borough of Mercier–Hochelaga-Maisonneuve in Montreal, Quebec, Canada. It is operated by the Société de transport de Montréal (STM) and serves the Green Line. It is located in the district of Hochelaga-Maisonneuve. The station opened on June 6, 1976, as part of the extension of the Green Line to Honoré-Beaugrand station.

Overview 
Designed by architect Marcel Raby, it is a normal side platform station built in tunnel. The walls of the platform have a unique yellow brick façade. It has no transept, with closed staircases leading to the mezzanine above; this gives access to two exits, one on either side of rue Hochelaga. The mezzanine contains a large illuminated mural sculpture by the architect, entitled Thème des mouvements du soleil ("theme of the sun's motion").

Origin of the name
This station is named for rue Joliette. Barthélémy Joliette (1789–1850) served in the House of Assembly and Legislative Council of Lower Canada; he also founded the village of L'Industrie (later Joliette, Quebec).

Connecting bus routes

Nearby points of interest
 Collège de Maisonneuve
 CLSC Hochelaga-Maisonneuve
See also CLSC
 Parc Lalancette

References

External links
 Joliette Station - official site
 Montreal by Metro, metrodemontreal.com - photos, information, and trivia
 2011 STM System Map
 Metro Map

Green Line (Montreal Metro)
Mercier–Hochelaga-Maisonneuve
Railway stations in Canada opened in 1976